Ivo Amulić was a Yugoslav politician and Mayor of Split during World War II.

Mayors of Split, Croatia
Yugoslav politicians